Brittany Jones (born January 18, 1996) is a Canadian former pair skater. With Joshua Reagan, she is the 2016 U.S. International Classic champion. She finished in the top six at three World Junior Championships with earlier partners.

Career 
Jones teamed up with Kurtis Gaskell around 2008. They placed sixth at the 2011 World Junior Championships. They split after the 2012 Canadian Championships. Jones then had a one-year partnership with Ian Beharry. The two finished sixth at the 2013 World Junior Championships.

In October 2013, Jones was paired with U.S. skater Joshua Reagan by Kristy Wirtz and Kris Wirtz, who coached the pair in Kitchener-Waterloo, Ontario. Jones/Reagan decided to compete for Canada and placed seventh at the 2014 Canadian Championships. They changed coaches in spring 2015, moving to Bryce Davison.

Jones/Reagan won gold at the 2016 U.S. International Classic after placing second in the short and first in the free.

Programs

With Reagan

With Beharry

With Gaskell

Competitive highlights 
GP: Grand Prix; CS: Challenger Series; JGP: Junior Grand Prix

Pair skating with Reagan

Pair skating with Beharry

Pair skating with Gaskell

Single skating

References

External links 

 
 
 

1996 births
Canadian female pair skaters
Living people
Figure skaters from Toronto